Mayra Verónica Aruca Rodríguez (born in August 20th, 1980) is an American singer, model, actress and  television public figure who became popular for her appearances on Spanish-language television. Verónica's role in Univision's Don Francisco Presenta brought her to the attention of FHM magazine's US edition. After appearing in FHM, she was included in its 2004 calendar and went on to do additional magazine work. She has taken part in many Spanish language television shows, as well as appearing in music videos and television commercials.

In 2012, Verónica signed an exclusive worldwide co-publishing deal with BMG Chrysalis in the US. In 2013, she signed with Simon Cowell's label Syco Music (Sony Music). Her debut EP, "Mama Mia", was released on August 29th, 2013 on Syco Music by Sony Music Entertainment UK. In 2015 Mayra Veronica signed a major record worldwide deal with Warner Bros. Records.
The Cuban-American's career has seen her grace the covers of FHM, Shape & Maxim, along with high-profile national ad campaigns with L'Oréal, Coca-Cola & Nike.

Verónica is a spokeswoman for the USO.

Early life
Mayra Verónica was born in Havana, Cuba, where her father was a member of Cuba's big band, Los Dada. In 1984, she came to the US with her mother, Mayra Rodriguez, leaving behind the rest of her family, including her father, Arturo Aruca, and sister Giselle Guzman. Her father came a year later and reunited with Veronica and her mother, while her sister was unable to meet them until thirteen years later. Mayra grew up with little money and food was sometimes scarce.

A gifted student, Verónica made her way through ballet school by befriending other girls (other students from her school who could afford the training), while surviving difficult financial circumstances at home. Her first boyfriend, at the age of 15, was an artist of the same age who often painted her nude or semi-nude.

Pageants and modeling 
Verónica continued school, and after joining a local beauty pageant and becoming Ms. Miami, the photographer who covered the event was captivated by Mayra's photos, and invited her to his studio for free sessions. Thus, Mayra obtained her first modeling book and signed with a local agent in Miami. The agent sent her to an audition for a local TV entertainment news show "Miami Hoy" (at the time Mayra was at Florida International University majoring in psychology and theater). She did not know much about being a reporter, but determined she could act like one. She was also an exotic dancer at Pure Platinum in Ft. Lauderdale for a few years as well as at Scores in New York.

She began as a correspondent, but was promoted to celebrity hostess for Miami Hoy. She interviewed celebrities like Donald Trump, Oscar de la Renta, Hugh Hefner, and Dennis Rodman. Throughout, Verónica traveled to New York to continue acting training at the Lee Strasberg Institute to fine tune her craft, until the station (owned by Media One) was bought by AT&T Corporation and subsequently closed.

Verónica landed a made-for-TV movie called The Suitor and did commercial campaigns for Nike, L'Oréal, and Coca-Cola. Univision announced a new show hosted by Don Francisco. They wanted Verónica to be their model and co-host, but with one catch. Due to her ample curves, her last appearance on screen for the day would entail her backside presented before turning around to face the camera, to which she gladly agreed. Once the show aired, the model with the great backside became the talk of Latinos everywhere, so much so, the American press became interested.

Cover girl 
FHM, the top men's magazine of the time, contacted Veronica's publicist to ask for a feature spread on their magazine. Veronica agreed and after mail requesting her return, she went on to appear on the cover of the FHM exclusive collection book, which included top sex symbols of the decade such as Pamela Anderson, Eva Longoria, and Carmen Electra.
From 2004 to 2010, Mayra Verónica made FHM'''s "Sexiest Women in the World" list six years in a row. She was featured on other covers for FHM, Maxim, Edge, GQ, Cosmo, Shape and over 100 other national and international covers. Her popularity on such covers made her website one of the top traffic websites, with more than 4 million hits biweekly.
With her popularity came email from soldiers stationed in Iraq asking for her posters and, by now, famous calendars. Veronica's management sent a care package of approximately 5000 posters. Shortly thereafter, the military named her the favorite pin-up girl for the US Marines and the USO asked her to tour with the troops.

 USO tour 
The USO tour became a special Thanksgiving tour with Vice Chairman of the Joint Chiefs of Staff General James Cartwright, actor Wilmer Valderrama, and comedian Russell Peters, traveling to six countries in six days: Iraq, Afghanistan, Germany, Turkey, Africa, and Greenland. The troops' response was overwhelming and although Verónica had previously decided not to do any more calendars, she changed her mind and appeared on one in 2008, dedicating proceeds to the Wounded Warrior Project.

Upon her return from the tour, she was described as a "modern day Betty Grable". Verónica continued touring with the USO and became an official spokesperson, appearing with then-President George W. Bush and Gary Sinise on a panel for C-SPAN about the organization.

On July 2nd, 2009, the New York Stock Exchange asked her to ring the NASDAQ bell for the Fourth of July week. Verónica decided to bring awareness to two of the organizations for which she's an advocate and spokesperson, The USO and UNICEF, and brought them to the bell ringing ceremony.

Verónica continued her work with the troops by visiting the wounded at Camp Lejeune.

 Music 

Verónica collaborated on her first album with Univision Network in 2007, which was titled Vengo Con To (Comin' At Ya With Everything). Performed in the musical style of reggaetón, Verónica's album included "Vengo Con To" of which King magazine said: "Verónica's moaning make Madonna's Erotica sound like bubblegum pop… chew on that Daddy Yankee." The song charted in the Top 40 on Billboard, while the music video was reportedly banned from Latin television. The album's popularity landed Verónica a deal with Universal Motown, which put out a second single from the album titled "Mamma Mia". A third single, "Es Tan Dificil Olvidarte", dedicated to fallen troops, put Verónica in the top 10 on the pop contemporary charts. In 2014, Veronica's song "Mama Mia" was nominated for "Best Latin Dance Song of The Year" by the 29th Annual International Dance Music Awards (IDMA). 

Verónica began 2010 on the cover of Billboard Magazine with a new single, "If You Wanna Fly", that reached #9 on Billboard's Hot Dance Club Play chart, #11 on Billboard's Hot Dance Airplay chart, #5 on Billboard Dance/Electronic sales, #17 on Billboard Heatseekers Songs and #74 Hot 100 Chart. She an album titled Saint Nor Sinner in 2012. Mayra Veronica landed the cover of  Billboard Magazine again in July 2011 for the release of her new single "Freak Like Me", which reached top 10 on the Billboard Hot Dance Club Charts. In March 2012 Mayra Veronica's video "Freak Like Me", featuring Antonio Sabato Jr. who play's Verónica's love interest, was added to MTV Hits & VHI Latin America on full rotation.

Veronica's "Ay Mama Mia" The Remixes went #1 on Billboard's Hot Dance Club Play chart in March 2013. "Ay Mama Mia" was produced by Grammy nominated producers, Dave Audé & Roy Tavaré. The video was directed by the Actor/Director Larenz Tate. The original Spanish music video reached over 12 million views on YouTube. 

Veronica's "MAMA YO!" is a collaboration with the Italian Electro Swing band The Sweet Life Society. The production is a remake of Carmen Miranda's "Mama Yo Quero". The electro house track, debuted on the US Billboard Dance/Mix Show chart and saw success in Europe and North America. The music video amassed over 10 Million combined views on YouTube. 

Discography
Studio albums
2007: Vengo Con To'2012: Saint Nor Sinner'' (Unreleased)

Singles

Label signed 
 2013 Mama Mia: Syco Music/Sony Music UK (worldwide) Ultra Music (US & Canada)
 2015 MAMA YO!: Warner Bros. Records Territory Worldwide licensed to excluding: disco:wax/Sony Music Scandinavia, EGO Music (Italy), Central Station Records/Universal Music Australia
 2015 No Boyfriend: Sony Music (worldwide) Ultra Music (US)
 2015 Officially signed an artist deal with Warner Bros. Records (worldwide)

See also
List of famous Cubans

References

External links

Official website

1980 births
Living people
American television actresses
American dance musicians
American female models
People from Havana
Cuban emigrants to the United States
Actresses from Miami
21st-century American singers
21st-century American women singers